Enrique Muñoz Arístegui (1856-1936) was a Mexican industrialist and politician. He lived in Mérida, Yucatán. He was three times the governor of Yucatán, in 1906, in 1907 to 1909 and then from 1910 to 1911.

References

 

1856 births
1936 deaths
People from Mérida, Yucatán
Governors of Yucatán (state)
Mexican industrialists